Eligio Sardiñas Montalvo (January 6, 1910 – August 8, 1988), better known as Kid Chocolate, was a Cuban boxer who enjoyed great success both in the boxing ring and outside it during the 1930s. Chocolate boxed professionally between 1927 and 1938. His record was 136 wins, 10 losses and 6 draws, 51 wins coming by knockout and one no-decision bout, also making Ring magazine's list of boxers with 50 or more career knockout wins. He became a member of the International Boxing Hall Of Fame alongside Bass, Berg and Canzoneri.

Biography

Career

Early years
Sardiñas, also nicknamed The Cuban Bon Bon, learned how to fight by watching old fight films in Cuba. He later sparred with boxers such as Benny Leonard and Jack Johnson, all world champions, before beginning an amateur boxing career. Sardiñas had no fear and would actively engage in fights outside the ring with anyone who wanted it.

His professional boxing debut, officially, occurred on March 3, 1928, when he knocked out Juan Sarriá Rodríguez aka 'Kid Sotolongo' via first round KO of a scheduled 6 round bout after having fought and won 3 semi-professional bouts from October 1927 to February 1928.

Taking the World Jr. Lightweight Championship

After going up in weight class to the Junior Lightweight division, he started 1931 by winning four fights in a row. Then, on July 15, his dream of becoming Cuba's first world boxing champion finally came true, as he knocked out the defending world Junior Lightweight champion Benny Bass in seven rounds to take the world title. Five non-title wins followed, including a first-round knockout in a rematch with Scalfaro. He finished the year by going up in weight once again, and challenging world Lightweight champion Tony Canzoneri, losing by a decision in 15 in his first attempt to gain the Lightweight crown.

He started 1932 by winning his first eight bouts, including a world title defense in Havana against Davie Abad, beaten in 15 by decision. Then, he faced "Kid" Berg in a rematch, losing again, this time by decision in 15. He engaged in seven more bouts, including two decision wins over Johnny Farr, before fighting Lew Feldman on October 13. The fight was recognized as a world Featherweight title bout, but only by the New York state athletic commission. Chocolate won by a knockout in 12 rounds, gaining the New York World title.

He defended that world title twice, including a third fight with LaBarba, before relinquishing it while in the middle of a European boxing tour that took him to Madrid, Barcelona and Paris. He won all of his fights on that tour by decision. Upon returning to America, he lost by a knockout in two in a rematch with Canzoneri.

Losing the World Jr. Lightweight Title to Frankie Klick

Before a crowd of 4,000, the Kid lost the World Jr. Lightweight boxing championship to Frankie Klick, on December 25, 1933 at the Arena in Philadelphia, Pennsylvania, in a seventh-round technical knockout. The Ludington Daily News, wrote "The flashy Cuban "bon bon" (Chocolate) was bereft of the title in the seventh round of a scheduled fifteen round Christmas Day bout by a whistling right smash to the chin and all he got in exchange was the second knockout of his career although the latest was of the technical variety."  The bout had been fairly close until the seventh with Chocolate showing stamina and style. The seventh round had gone two minutes and fifty-eight seconds when the knockout occurred. "The Cuban waged a fast, aggressive fight in the early rounds that gave him a temporary lead."  Chocolate had landed rights "to the head and body."  Kid Chocolate may have been suffering from the knockout he had received from Tony Canzoneri only a month previously.  Chocolate retained his featherweight championship at least in the state of New York. After that fight, it was revealed that he was suffering from syphilis.

Later years

He retired shortly thereafter, but came back in 1934. He won 47 of his next 50 bouts. He never received another world title attempt and felt abandoned by boxing's elite. He retired again in 1938.

Kid Chocolate enjoyed the city's nightlife. However, when he stepped out of boxing, he went back to Cuba and lived a quieter life.

Legacy
From 1959, Chocolate's fame in Cuba was overlooked by Fidel Castro and his revolutionary forces, and he almost became a forgotten champion. But, by the late 1970s, Chocolate's achievements were finally recognized by the Cuban government, who gave him a small pension. Chocolate died in his own home - bought for his mother when he was champion - in 1988.

He was the inspiration for the character Chocolate Drop in Clifford Odets' play Golden Boy.

Former WBO middleweight champion Peter Quillin, an American of Cuban descent, carries the nickname "Kid Chocolate" in honor of Sardiñas.

The highly acclaimed greatest pound for pound boxer of all time Sugar Ray Robinson was a big fan of Kid Chocolate and incorporated a lot of Chocolate's boxing style into his own: "Sugar Ray Robinson was a great admirer of Kid Chocolate," said Fausto Miranda, a former Cuban journalist who covered many of Chocolate's fights. Sugar Ray Robinson, went on record saying that he had never seen anyone box like Kid Chocolate before. Robinson studied the Chocolate style and incorporated much of his slick movement and graceful flair into his own boxing style. Robinson in many ways was a combination of his boxing idols Joe Louis and Kid Chocolate. He mixed the concentration, masterful combinations and power punching of Louis with the stylish movement and balance of Chocolate.

Montalvo was also the cousin of the lesser known flyweight contender Eladio 'Black Bill' Valdés.

Professional boxing record

{|class="wikitable" style="text-align:center"
|-
!
!Result
!Record
!Opponent
!Type
!Round
!Date
!Location
!Notes
|-
|152
|Draw
|136–10–6
|style="text-align:left"| Nicky Jerome
|PTS
|10
|Dec 18, 1938
|style="text-align:left"|  
|style="text-align:left"|
|- style="text-align:center"
|151
|Win
|136–10–5
|style="text-align:left"| Fillo Echevarria
|PTS
|10
|Mar 20, 1938
|style="text-align:left"|  
|style="text-align:left"|
|- style="text-align:center"
|150
|Win
|135–10–5
|style="text-align:left"| Johnny Mirabella
|KO
|4 (10)
|Dec 23, 1937
|style="text-align:left"|  
|style="text-align:left"|
|- style="text-align:center"
|149
|Win
|134–10–5
|style="text-align:left"| Young Chappie
|PTS
|10
|Nov 6, 1937
|style="text-align:left"|  
|style="text-align:left"|
|- style="text-align:center"
|148
|Win
|133–10–5
|style="text-align:left"| Phil Baker
|PTS
|10
|Sep 5, 1937
|style="text-align:left"|  
|style="text-align:left"|
|- style="text-align:center"
|147
|Win
|132–10–5
|style="text-align:left"| Johnny DeFoe
|UD
|10
|Aug 19, 1937
|style="text-align:left"|  
|style="text-align:left"|
|- style="text-align:center"
|146
|Win
|131–10–5
|style="text-align:left"| Jimmy Tramberia
|KO
|3 (10)
|Aug 16, 1937
|style="text-align:left"|  
|style="text-align:left"|
|- style="text-align:center"
|145
|Win
|130–10–5
|style="text-align:left"| Joe Marciente
|PTS
|10
|Aug 13, 1937
|style="text-align:left"|  
|style="text-align:left"|
|- style="text-align:center"
|144
|Win
|129–10–5
|style="text-align:left"| Charley Gomer
|PTS
|10
|Aug 2, 1937
|style="text-align:left"|  
|style="text-align:left"|
|- style="text-align:center"
|143
|Draw
|128–10–5
|style="text-align:left"| Orville Drouillard
|PTS
|8
|Jul 27, 1937
|style="text-align:left"|  
|style="text-align:left"|
|- style="text-align:center"
|142
|Win
|128–10–4
|style="text-align:left"| Young Chappie
|PTS
|8
|Jul 20, 1937
|style="text-align:left"|  
|style="text-align:left"|
|- style="text-align:center"
|141
|Win
|127–10–4
|style="text-align:left"| Charley Gomer
|PTS
|8
|Jun 7, 1937
|style="text-align:left"|  
|style="text-align:left"|
|- style="text-align:center"
|140
|Win
|126–10–4
|style="text-align:left"| Joe Marciente
|PTS
|8
|Jul 2, 1937
|style="text-align:left"|  
|style="text-align:left"|
|- style="text-align:center"
|139
|Win
|125–10–4
|style="text-align:left"| Al Gillette
|TKO
|4 (10)
|Jun 18, 1937
|style="text-align:left"|  
|style="text-align:left"|
|- style="text-align:center"
|138
|Win
|124–10–4
|style="text-align:left"| Young Chappie
|PTS
|8
|Jun 15, 1937
|style="text-align:left"|  
|style="text-align:left"|
|- style="text-align:center"
|137
|Win
|123–10–4
|style="text-align:left"| Al Reid
|PTS
|10
|Jun 2, 1937
|style="text-align:left"|  
|style="text-align:left"|
|- style="text-align:center"
|136
|Win
|122–10–4
|style="text-align:left"| Henry Hook
|PTS
|10
|May 25, 1937
|style="text-align:left"|  
|style="text-align:left"|
|- style="text-align:center"
|135
|Win
|121–10–4
|style="text-align:left"| Frankie Anselm
|PTS
|10
|Apr 9, 1937
|style="text-align:left"|  
|style="text-align:left"|
|- style="text-align:center"
|134
|Win
|120–10–4
|style="text-align:left"| Allie Tedesco
|PTS
|8
|Mar 27, 1937
|style="text-align:left"|  
|style="text-align:left"|
|- style="text-align:center"
|133
|Win
|119–10–4
|style="text-align:left"| Joe Woods
|KO
|1 (8)
|Mar 18, 1937
|style="text-align:left"|  
|style="text-align:left"|
|- style="text-align:center"
|132
|Draw
|118–10–4
|style="text-align:left"| Bernie Friedkin
|PTS
|8
|Mar 9, 1937
|style="text-align:left"|  
|style="text-align:left"|
|- style="text-align:center"
|131
|Win
|118–10–3
|style="text-align:left"| Jimmy Lancaster
|PTS
|6
|Feb 27, 1937
|style="text-align:left"|  
|style="text-align:left"|
|- style="text-align:center"
|130
|Win
|117–10–3
|style="text-align:left"| Johnny Mirabella
|PTS
|8
|Jan 28, 1937
|style="text-align:left"|  
|style="text-align:left"|
|- style="text-align:center"
|129
|Win
|116–10–3
|style="text-align:left"| Tony Pagano
|TKO
|4 (8)
|Jan 19, 1937
|style="text-align:left"|  
|style="text-align:left"|
|- style="text-align:center"
|128
|Win
|115–10–3
|style="text-align:left"| Johnny Erickson
|TKO
|5 (10)
|Jan 13, 1937
|style="text-align:left"|  
|style="text-align:left"|
|- style="text-align:center"
|127
|Win
|114–10–3
|style="text-align:left"| Joe LaFauci
|PTS
|8
|Jan 7, 1937
|style="text-align:left"|  
|style="text-align:left"|
|- style="text-align:center"
|126
|Win
|113–10–3
|style="text-align:left"| Al Gillette
|PTS
|8
|Dec 26, 1936
|style="text-align:left"|  
|style="text-align:left"|
|- style="text-align:center"
|125
|Win
|112–10–3
|style="text-align:left"| Johnny Erickson
|PTS
|8
|Dec 19, 1936
|style="text-align:left"|  
|style="text-align:left"|
|- style="text-align:center"
|124
|Loss
|111–10–3
|style="text-align:left"| Phil Baker
|UD
|10
|Dec 7, 1935
|style="text-align:left"|  
|style="text-align:left"|
|- style="text-align:center"
|123
|Win
|111–9–3
|style="text-align:left"| Jose Santos
|PTS
|10
|Sep 19, 1936
|style="text-align:left"|  
|style="text-align:left"|
|- style="text-align:center"
|122
|Win
|110–9–3
|style="text-align:left"| Joey Brown
|PTS
|10
|Jul 18, 1936
|style="text-align:left"|  
|style="text-align:left"|
|- style="text-align:center"
|121
|Win
|109–9–3
|style="text-align:left"| Johnny Erickson
|PTS
|10
|Jun 20, 1937
|style="text-align:left"|  
|style="text-align:left"|
|- style="text-align:center"
|120
|Win
|108–9–3
|style="text-align:left"| Lew Feldman
|PTS
|10
|May 30, 1936
|style="text-align:left"|  
|style="text-align:left"|
|- style="text-align:center"
|119
|Win
|107–9–3
|style="text-align:left"| Andy Martin
|PTS
|10
|Feb 1, 1936
|style="text-align:left"|  
|style="text-align:left"|
|- style="text-align:center"
|118
|Win
|106–9–3
|style="text-align:left"| Pelon Guerra
|KO
|3 (10)
|Nov 30, 1935
|style="text-align:left"|  
|style="text-align:left"|
|- style="text-align:center"
|117
|Win
|105–9–3
|style="text-align:left"| Kid Jackson
|KO
|7 (10)
|Sep 3, 1935
|style="text-align:left"|  
|style="text-align:left"|
|- style="text-align:center"
|116
|Win
|104–9–3
|style="text-align:left"| Pete Nebo
|PTS
|10
|Jul 4, 1935
|style="text-align:left"|  
|style="text-align:left"|
|- style="text-align:center"
|115
|Loss
|103–9–3
|style="text-align:left"| Simon Chavez
|PTS
|10
|Mar 17, 1935
|style="text-align:left"|  
|style="text-align:left"|
|- style="text-align:center"
|114
|Win
|103–8–3
|style="text-align:left"| Cliff Boykin
|KO
|5 (10)
|Jan 19, 1935
|style="text-align:left"|  
|style="text-align:left"|
|- style="text-align:center"
|113
|Win
|102–8–3
|style="text-align:left"| Jerry Mazza
|PTS
|10
|Nov 5, 1934
|style="text-align:left"|  
|style="text-align:left"|
|- style="text-align:center"
|112
|Win
|101–8–3
|style="text-align:left"| Andre Sarilla
|KO
|7 (10)
|Aug 17, 1934
|style="text-align:left"|  
|style="text-align:left"|
|- style="text-align:center"
|111
|Win
|100–8–3
|style="text-align:left"| Buster Brown
|PTS
|8
|Jul 31, 1934
|style="text-align:left"|  
|style="text-align:left"|
|- style="text-align:center"
|110
|Loss
|99–8–3
|style="text-align:left"| Petey Hayes
|UD
|10
|Jul 11, 1935
|style="text-align:left"|  
|style="text-align:left"|
|- style="text-align:center"
|109
|Win
|99–7–3
|style="text-align:left"| Johnny Erickson
|PTS
|10
|Jul 6, 1935
|style="text-align:left"|  
|style="text-align:left"|
|- style="text-align:center"
|108
|Win
|98–7–3
|style="text-align:left"| Frankie Marchese
|PTS
|10
|Jun 28, 1934
|style="text-align:left"|  
|style="text-align:left"|
|- style="text-align:center"
|107
|Win
|97–7–3
|style="text-align:left"| Emil Paluso
|TKO
|7 (10)
|May 29, 1934
|style="text-align:left"| 
|style="text-align:left"|
|- style="text-align:center"
|106
|Draw
|96–7–3
|style="text-align:left"| Tommy Paul
|PTS
|10
|May 22, 1934
|style="text-align:left"|  
|style="text-align:left"|
|- style="text-align:center"
|105
|Win
|96–7–2
|style="text-align:left"| Pete Nebo
|PTS
|10
|May 11, 1934
|style="text-align:left"|  
|style="text-align:left"|
|- style="text-align:center"
|104
|Draw
|95–7–2
|style="text-align:left"| Bobby Gray
|PTS
|10
|Apr 24, 1934
|style="text-align:left"| 
|style="text-align:left"|
|- style="text-align:center"
|103
|Win
|95–7–1
|style="text-align:left"| Frankie Wallace
|PTS
|10
|Apr 16, 1934
|style="text-align:left"|  
|style="text-align:left"|
|- style="text-align:center"
|102
|Loss
|94–7–1
|style="text-align:left"| Frankie Klick 
|TKO
|7 (15)
|Dec 25, 1933
|style="text-align:left"|  
|style="text-align:left;"|
|- style="text-align:center"
|101
|Win
|94–6–1
|style="text-align:left"| Frankie Wallace
|PTS
|10
|Dec 4, 1933
|style="text-align:left"| 
|style="text-align:left;"|
|- style="text-align:center"
|100
|Loss
|93–6–1
|style="text-align:left"| Tony Canzoneri
|KO
|2 (10)
|Nov 24, 1933
|style="text-align:left"|  
|style="text-align:left"|
|- style="text-align:center"
|99
|Win
|93–5–1
|style="text-align:left"| Joe Ghnouly
|MD
|10
|Nov 1, 1933
|style="text-align:left"|  
|style="text-align:left"|
|- style="text-align:center"
|98
|Win
|92–5–1
|style="text-align:left"| Nic Bensa
|TKO
|10 (10)
|Sep 29, 1933
|style="text-align:left"|  
|style="text-align:left"|
|- style="text-align:center"
|97
|Win
|91–5–1
|style="text-align:left"| Frans Machtens
|PTS
|10
|Aug 2, 1933
|style="text-align:left"|  
|style="text-align:left"|
|- style="text-align:center"
|96
|Win
|90–5–1
|style="text-align:left"| Nic Bensa
|PTS
|10
|Jul 15, 1933
|style="text-align:left"| 
|style="text-align:left"|
|- style="text-align:center"
|95
|Win
|89–5–1
|style="text-align:left"| Seaman Tommy Watson
|UD
|15
|May 19, 1933
|style="text-align:left"|  
|style="text-align:left;"|
|- style="text-align:center"
|94
|Win
|88–5–1
|style="text-align:left"| Johnny Farr
|UD
|10
|May 1, 1933
|style="text-align:left"|  
|style="text-align:left;"|
|- style="text-align:center"
|93
|Win
|87–5–1
|style="text-align:left"| Fidel LaBarba
|MD
|15
|Dec 9, 1932
|style="text-align:left"|  
|style="text-align:left;"|
|- style="text-align:center"
|92
|Win
|86–5–1
|style="text-align:left"| Johnny Alba
|PTS
|6
|Nov 29, 1932
|style="text-align:left"|  
|style="text-align:left"|
|- style="text-align:center"
|91
|Win
|85–5–1
|style="text-align:left"| Eddie Reilly
|PTS
|10
|Nov 21, 1932
|style="text-align:left"|  
|style="text-align:left"|
|- style="text-align:center"
|90
|Win
|84–5–1
|style="text-align:left"| Pete Nebo
|PTS
|10
|Nov 14, 1932
|style="text-align:left"|  
|style="text-align:left"|
|- style="text-align:center"
|89
|Win
|83–5–1
|style="text-align:left"| Lew Feldman
|KO
|12 (15)
|Oct 13, 1932
|style="text-align:left"|  
|style="text-align:left;"|
|- style="text-align:center"
|88
|Win
|82–5–1
|style="text-align:left"| Johnny Farr
|PTS
|10
|Oct 4, 1932
|style="text-align:left"|  
|style="text-align:left"|
|- style="text-align:center"
|87
|Win
|81–5–1
|style="text-align:left"| Frank Fariello
|PTS
|6
|Sep 15, 1932
|style="text-align:left"|  
|style="text-align:left"|
|- style="text-align:center"
|86
|Win
|80–5–1
|style="text-align:left"| Steve Smith
|UD
|10
|Sep 6, 1932
|style="text-align:left"|  
|style="text-align:left"|
|- style="text-align:center"
|85
|Win
|79–5–1
|style="text-align:left"| Frankie Marchese
|KO
|4 (6)
|Sep 1, 1932
|style="text-align:left"|  
|style="text-align:left"|
|- style="text-align:center"
|84
|Win
|78–5–1
|style="text-align:left"| Johnny Farr
|PTS
|10
|Aug 10, 1932
|style="text-align:left"|  
|style="text-align:left"|
|- style="text-align:center"
|83
|Win
|77–5–1
|style="text-align:left"| Eddie Shea
|UD
|10
|Aug 4, 1932
|style="text-align:left"|  
|style="text-align:left;"|
|- style="text-align:center"
|82
|Loss
|76–5–1
|style="text-align:left"| Jack 'Kid' Berg
|MD
|15
|Jul 18, 1932
|style="text-align:left"|  
|style="text-align:left;"|
|- style="text-align:center"
|81
|Win
|76–4–1
|style="text-align:left"| Johnny Farr
|UD
|10
|Jun 22, 1932
|style="text-align:left"|  
|style="text-align:left"|
|- style="text-align:center"
|80
|Win
|75–4–1
|style="text-align:left"| Roger Bernard
|PTS
|10
|Jun 16, 1932
|style="text-align:left"|  
|style="text-align:left"|
|- style="text-align:center"
|79
|Win
|74–4–1
|style="text-align:left"| Mike Sarko
|PTS
|10
|Jun 6, 1932
|style="text-align:left"|  
|style="text-align:left"|
|- style="text-align:center"
|78
|Win
|73–4–1
|style="text-align:left"| Lew Feldman
|UD
|15
|Jun 1, 1932
|style="text-align:left"|  
|style="text-align:left"|
|- style="text-align:center"
|77
|Win
|72–4–1
|style="text-align:left"| Steve Smith
|PTS
|10
|May 26, 1932
|style="text-align:left"|  
|style="text-align:left"|
|- style="text-align:center"
|76
|Win
|71–4–1
|style="text-align:left"| Mike Sarko
|PTS
|10
|May 16, 1932
|style="text-align:left"|  
|style="text-align:left"|
|- style="text-align:center"
|75
|Win
|70–4–1
|style="text-align:left"| Davey Abad
|PTS
|15
|Apr 10, 1932
|style="text-align:left"|  
|style="text-align:left;"|
|- style="text-align:center"
|74
|Win
|69–4–1
|style="text-align:left"| Dominick Petrone
|PTS
|10
|Mar 6, 1932
|style="text-align:left"|  
|style="text-align:left"|
|- style="text-align:center"
|73
|Win
|68–4–1
|style="text-align:left"| Maxie Leiner
|KO
|1 (10)
|Nov 30, 1932
|style="text-align:left"|  
|style="text-align:left"|
|- style="text-align:center"
|72
|Loss
|67–4–1
|style="text-align:left"| Tony Canzoneri
|SD
|15
|Nov 20, 1931
|style="text-align:left"|  
|style="text-align:left;"|
|- style="text-align:center"
|71
|Win
|67–3–1
|style="text-align:left"| Lew Feldman
|UD
|10
|Nov 2, 1931
|style="text-align:left"|  
|style="text-align:left"|
|- style="text-align:center"
|70
|Win
|66–3–1
|style="text-align:left"| Buck Oliva
|KO
|2 (10)
|Oct 26, 1931
|style="text-align:left"|  
|style="text-align:left"|
|- style="text-align:center"
|69
|Win
|65–3–1
|style="text-align:left"| Al 'Rube' Goldberg
|TKO
|3 (10)
|Oct 21, 1931
|style="text-align:left"|  
|style="text-align:left"|
|- style="text-align:center"
|68
|Win
|64–3–1
|style="text-align:left"| Steve Smith
|PTS
|10
|Oct 12, 1931
|style="text-align:left"|  
|style="text-align:left"|
|- style="text-align:center"
|67
|Win
|63–3–1
|style="text-align:left"| Joey Scalfaro
|TKO
|1 (10)
|Oct 1, 1931
|style="text-align:left"|  
|style="text-align:left;"|
|- style="text-align:center"
|66
|Win
|62–3–1
|style="text-align:left"| Benny Bass
|TKO
|7 (10)
|Jul 15, 1931
|style="text-align:left"|  
|style="text-align:left;"|
|- style="text-align:center"
|65
|Win
|61–3–1
|style="text-align:left"| Harry Sankey
|PTS
|10
|Jun 29, 1931
|style="text-align:left"|  
|style="text-align:left"|
|- style="text-align:center"
|64
|Win
|60–3–1
|style="text-align:left"| Maxie Leiner
|PTS
|10
|Jun 17, 1931
|style="text-align:left"|  
|style="text-align:left"|
|- style="text-align:center"
|63
|Win
|59–3–1
|style="text-align:left"| Steve Smith
|PTS
|10
|Jun 12, 1931
|style="text-align:left"|  
|style="text-align:left"|
|- style="text-align:center"
|62
|Win
|58–3–1
|style="text-align:left"| George Goldberg
|TKO
|7 (10)
|May 29, 1931
|style="text-align:left"|  
|style="text-align:left"|
|- style="text-align:center"
|61
|Loss
|57–3–1
|style="text-align:left"| Battling Battalino
|UD
|15
|Dec 12, 1930
|style="text-align:left"| 
|style="text-align:left;"|
|- style="text-align:center"
|60
|Loss
|57–2–1
|style="text-align:left"| Fidel LaBarba
|UD
|10
|Nov 3, 1930
|style="text-align:left"|  
|style="text-align:left"|
|- style="text-align:center"
|59
|Win
|57–1–1
|style="text-align:left"| Mickey Doyle
|KO
|1 (10)
|Oct 27, 1930
|style="text-align:left"|  
|style="text-align:left"|
|- style="text-align:center"
|58
|Win
|56–1–1
|style="text-align:left"| Benny Nabors
|KO
|1 (10)
|Oct 16, 1930
|style="text-align:left"|  
|style="text-align:left"|
|- style="text-align:center"
|57
|Loss
|55–1–1
|style="text-align:left"| Jack 'Kid' Berg
|SD
|10
|Aug 7, 1930
|style="text-align:left"|  
|style="text-align:left"|
|- style="text-align:center"
|56
|Win
|55–0–1
|style="text-align:left"| Luigi Quadrini
|PTS
|10
|Jul 15, 1930
|style="text-align:left"|  
|style="text-align:left"|
|- style="text-align:center"
|55
|Win
|54–0–1
|style="text-align:left"| Vic Burrone
|KO
|3 (10)
|Jul 10, 1930
|style="text-align:left"|  
|style="text-align:left"|
|- style="text-align:center"
|54
|Win
|53–0–1
|style="text-align:left"| Dominick Petrone
|TKO
|6 (10)
|Jul 2, 1930
|style="text-align:left"|  
|style="text-align:left"|
|- style="text-align:center"
|53
|Win
|52–0–1
|style="text-align:left"| Johnny Erickson
|PTS
|10
|Apr 28, 1930
|style="text-align:left"|  
|style="text-align:left"|
|- style="text-align:center"
|52
|Win
|51–0–1
|style="text-align:left"| Al Ridgeway
|TKO
|2 (10)
|Mar 21, 1930
|style="text-align:left"|  
|style="text-align:left"|
|- style="text-align:center"
|51
|Win
|50–0–1
|style="text-align:left"| Benny Hall
|PTS
|10
|Mar 5, 1930
|style="text-align:left"| 
|style="text-align:left"|
|- style="text-align:center"
|50
|Win
|49–0–1
|style="text-align:left"| Vic Burrone
|PTS
|10
|Feb 23, 1930
|style="text-align:left"| 
|style="text-align:left"|
|- style="text-align:center"
|49
|Win
|48–0–1
|style="text-align:left"| Johnny Lawson
|KO
|2 (10)
|Dec 21, 1929
|style="text-align:left"|  
|style="text-align:left"|
|- style="text-align:center"
|48
|Win
|47–0–1
|style="text-align:left"| Dominick Petrone
|PTS
|10
|Dec 18, 1929
|style="text-align:left"|  
|style="text-align:left"|
|- style="text-align:center"
|47
|Win
|46–0–1
|style="text-align:left"| Herman Silverberg
|KO
|1 (10)
|Dec 10, 1929
|style="text-align:left"|  
|style="text-align:left"|
|- style="text-align:center"
|46
|Win
|45–0–1
|style="text-align:left"| Eddie O'Dowd
|KO
|2 (10)
|Nov 27, 1929
|style="text-align:left"|  
|style="text-align:left"|
|- style="text-align:center"
|45
|Win
|44–0–1
|style="text-align:left"| Jim El Zaird
|PTS
|10
|Nov 19, 1929
|style="text-align:left"|  
|style="text-align:left"|
|- style="text-align:center"
|44
|Win
|43–0–1
|style="text-align:left"| Johnny Erickson
|PTS
|10
|Nov 9, 1929
|style="text-align:left"|  
|style="text-align:left"|
|- style="text-align:center"
|43
|Win
|42–0–1
|style="text-align:left"| Al Singer
|SD
|12
|Aug 29, 1929
|style="text-align:left"|  
|style="text-align:left"|
|- style="text-align:center"
|42
|Win
|41–0–1
|style="text-align:left"| Tommy Lorenzo
|TKO
|6 (10)
|Aug 7, 1929
|style="text-align:left"|  
|style="text-align:left"|
|- style="text-align:center"
|41
|Win
|40–0–1
|style="text-align:left"| Steve Smith
|UD
|10
|Jul 30, 1929
|style="text-align:left"|  
|style="text-align:left"|
|- style="text-align:center"
|40
|Win
|39–0–1
|style="text-align:left"| Milton Cohen
|PTS
|10
|Jul 19, 1929
|style="text-align:left"|  
|style="text-align:left"|
|- style="text-align:center"
|39
|Win
|38–0–1
|style="text-align:left"| Ignacio Fernandez
|PTS
|10
|Jul 10, 1929
|style="text-align:left"|  
|style="text-align:left"|
|- style="text-align:center"
|38
|Win
|37–0–1
|style="text-align:left"| Jackie Johnston
|KO
|1 (10)
|Jun 24, 1929
|style="text-align:left"|  
|style="text-align:left"|
|- style="text-align:center"
|37
|Win
|36–0–1
|style="text-align:left"| Terry Roth
|TKO
|3 (10)
|Jun 18, 1929
|style="text-align:left"|  
|style="text-align:left"|
|- style="text-align:center"
|36
|Win
|35–0–1
|style="text-align:left"| Gregorio Vidal
|SD
|10
|Jun 5, 1929
|style="text-align:left"|  
|style="text-align:left"|
|- style="text-align:center"
|35
|Win
|34–0–1
|style="text-align:left"| Fidel LaBarba
|MD
|10
|May 22, 1929
|style="text-align:left"|   
|style="text-align:left"|
|- style="text-align:center"
|34
|Win
|33–0–1
|style="text-align:left"| Steve Smith
|UD
|10
|May 7, 1929
|style="text-align:left"|  
|style="text-align:left"|
|- style="text-align:center"
|33
|Win
|32–0–1
|style="text-align:left"| Tommy Ryan
|KO
|1 (10)
|Apr 29, 1929
|style="text-align:left"|  
|style="text-align:left"|
|- style="text-align:center"
|32
|Win
|31–0–1
|style="text-align:left"| Vic Burrone
|UD
|10
|Apr 22, 1929
|style="text-align:left"|  
|style="text-align:left"|
|- style="text-align:center"
|31
|Win
|30–0–1
|style="text-align:left"| Bushy Graham
|DQ
|7 (15)
|Apr 12, 1929
|style="text-align:left"|  
|style="text-align:left"|
|- style="text-align:center"
|30
|Win
|29–0–1
|style="text-align:left"| Johnny Vacca
|TKO
|9 (10)
|Mar 22, 1929
|style="text-align:left"|  
|style="text-align:left"|
|- style="text-align:center"
|29
|Win
|28–0–1
|style="text-align:left"| Al Rackow
|KO
|4 (10)
|Mar 18, 1929
|style="text-align:left"|  
|style="text-align:left"|
|- style="text-align:center"
|28
|Win
|27–0–1
|style="text-align:left"|  Phil O'Dowd
|KO
|1 (10)
|Mar 9, 1929
|style="text-align:left"|  
|style="text-align:left"|
|- style="text-align:center"
|27
|Win
|26–0–1
|style="text-align:left"| Chick Suggs
|UD
|10
|Dec 24, 1929
|style="text-align:left"|  
|style="text-align:left;"|
|- style="text-align:center"
|26
|Win
|25–0–1
|style="text-align:left"| Pancho Dencio
|TKO
|2 (10)
|Dec 22, 1928
|style="text-align:left"|  
|style="text-align:left"|
|- style="text-align:center"
|25
|Win
|24–0–1
|style="text-align:left"| Emil Paluso
|TKO
|8 (10)
|Dec 17, 1928
|style="text-align:left"|  
|style="text-align:left"|
|- style="text-align:center"
|24
|Win
|23–0–1
|style="text-align:left"| Johnny Helstein
|PTS
|10
|Dec 10, 1928
|style="text-align:left"|  
|style="text-align:left"|
|- style="text-align:center"
|23
|Draw
|22–0–1
|style="text-align:left"| Joey Scalfaro
|PTS
|10
|Nov 30, 1928
|style="text-align:left"|  
|style="text-align:left"|
|- style="text-align:center"
|22
|Win
|22–0
|style="text-align:left"| Pinky May
|TKO
|6 (10)
|Nov 24, 1928
|style="text-align:left"| 
|style="text-align:left"|
|- style="text-align:center"
|21
|Win
|21–0
|style="text-align:left"| Jackie Schweitzer
|KO
|6 (10)
|Nov 19, 1928
|style="text-align:left"|  
|
|- style="text-align:center"
|20
|Win
|20–0
|style="text-align:left"| Pinky Silverberg
|PTS
|8
|Nov 8, 1928
|style="text-align:left"|  
|style="text-align:left"|
|- style="text-align:center"
|19
|Win
|19–0
|style="text-align:left"| Frisco Grande
|TKO
|4 (10)
|Nov 3, 1928
|style="text-align:left"|  
|style="text-align:left"|
|- style="text-align:center"
|18
|Win
|18–0
|style="text-align:left"| Joey Ross
|KO
|1 (10)
|Oct 29, 1928
|style="text-align:left"|  
|style="text-align:left"|
|- style="text-align:center"
|17
|Win
|17–0
|style="text-align:left"| Eddie O'Dowd
|PTS
|10
|Oct 10, 1928
|style="text-align:left"|  
|style="text-align:left"|
|- style="text-align:center"
|16
|Win
|16–0
|style="text-align:left"| Johnny Erickson
|PTS
|10
|Oct 1, 1928
|style="text-align:left"|  
|style="text-align:left"|
|- style="text-align:center"
|15
|Win
|15–0
|style="text-align:left"| Sammy Tisch
|PTS
|10
|sep 17, 1928
|style="text-align:left"|  
|style="text-align:left"|
|- style="text-align:center"
|14
|Win
|14–0
|style="text-align:left"| Mike Castle
|TKO
|3 (10)
|Aug 31, 1928
|style="text-align:left"|  
|style="text-align:left"|
|- style="text-align:center"
|13
|Win
|13–0
|style="text-align:left"| Nick Mercer
|KO
|3 (8)
|Aug 25, 1928
|style="text-align:left"| 
|style="text-align:left"|
|- style="text-align:center"
|12
|Win
|12–0
|style="text-align:left"| Johnny Green
|KO
|6 (10)
|Aug 15, 1928
|style="text-align:left"|  
|style="text-align:left"|
|- style="text-align:center"
|11
|Win
|11–0
|style="text-align:left"| Nick DeSalvo
|PTS
|8
|Jul 25, 1928
|style="text-align:left"|  
|style="text-align:left"|
|- style="text-align:center"
|10
|Win
|10–0
|style="text-align:left"| Eddie Enos
|TKO
|3 (8)
|Jul 11, 1928
|style="text-align:left"| 
|style="text-align:left"|
|- style="text-align:center"
|9
|Win
|9–0
|style="text-align:left"| Pablo Blanco
|KO
|5 (10)
|Jun 16, 1928
|style="text-align:left"|  
|style="text-align:left"|
|- style="text-align:center"
|8
|Win
|8–0
|style="text-align:left"| Jose 'Joe' Castillo
|PTS
|6
|Jun 4, 1928
|style="text-align:left"|  
|style="text-align:left"|
|- style="text-align:center"
|7
|Win
|7–0
|style="text-align:left"| Kid Saguita
|TKO
|5 (10)
|May 14, 1928
|style="text-align:left"|  
|style="text-align:left"|
|- style="text-align:center"
|6
|Win
|6–0
|style="text-align:left"| Clemente 'Remache' Morales
|TKO
|4 (10)
|Apr 7, 1928
|style="text-align:left"|  
|style="text-align:left"|
|- style="text-align:center"
|5
|Win
|5–0
|style="text-align:left"| Angel Diaz
|KO
|7 (10)
|Mar 10, 1928
|style="text-align:left"|  
|style="text-align:left"|
|- style="text-align:center"
|4
|Win
|4–0
|style="text-align:left"| Kid Sotolongo
|KO
|1 (6)
|Mar 3, 1928
|style="text-align:left"|  
|style="text-align:left"|
|- style="text-align:center"
|3
|Win
|3–0
|style="text-align:left"| Johnny Cruz
|KO
|5 (6)
|Feb 11, 1928
|style="text-align:left"|  
|style="text-align:left"|
|- style="text-align:center"
|2
|Win
|2–0
|style="text-align:left"| Jose 'Joe' Castillo
|PTS
|6
|Dec 17, 1927
|style="text-align:left"|  
|style="text-align:left"|
|- style="text-align:center"
|1
|Win
|1–0
|style="text-align:left"| Johnny Cruz
|UD
|6
|Oct 22, 1927
|style="text-align:left"| 
|

See also
List of super featherweight boxing champions

References

External links

https://boxrec.com/media/index.php/The_Ring_Magazine%27s_Annual_Ratings:_Featherweight--1930s
https://boxrec.com/media/index.php/The_Ring_Magazine%27s_Annual_Ratings:_Lightweight--1930s
Kid Chocolate - CBZ Profile

1910 births
1988 deaths
Featherweight boxers
Lightweight boxers
World boxing champions
International Boxing Hall of Fame inductees
Cuban male boxers